Kompong Luong (or Phumĭ Kâmpóng Luŏng) is a large floating village north of Krakor, on Tonlé Sap Lake. Its distance from Krakor and NH5 may vary from 2 to 7 km, following the seasonal expansion and shrinking of the lake. Most inhabitants are Vietnamese-speaking people.

References

External links 
 

Populated places in Pursat province